The Andorrà Open is a WTA 125-level professional women's tennis tournament. It takes place on indoor hard courts, in the months of November-December at the Poliesportiu d'Andorra in the city of Andorra la Vella in the principality of Andorra. The prize money is $115,000, making it the biggest ever tennis tournament to have been held in Andorra. Prior to this event, an ATP Challenger tournament was also held on outdoor hard courts at the Club Tennis Santa Coloma in Andorra la Vella between 2000 and 2004.

Results

Men's singles

Women's singles

Men's doubles

Women's doubles

See also
 WTA 125 tournaments

References

Hard court tennis tournaments
WTA 125 tournaments
Sport in Andorra
Recurring sporting events established in 2022